Beatriz Prades Insa (born 16 November 1999) is a Spanish footballer who plays as a midfielder for Scottish club Glasgow City.

Club career
Prades started her career at Villarreal.

References

External links
Profile at La Liga

1999 births
Living people
Women's association football midfielders
Spanish women's footballers
People from Onda
Sportspeople from the Province of Castellón
Footballers from the Valencian Community
Villarreal CF (women) players
Levante UD Femenino players
Primera División (women) players
Segunda Federación (women) players
Spanish expatriate sportspeople in Scotland
Expatriate women's footballers in Scotland
Spanish expatriate women's footballers
Glasgow City F.C. players